Sebastian Valeriu Culda (born 9 February 1996) is a Romanian professional footballer who plays as a midfielder for SCM Zalău.

Club career

Unirea Alba Iulia
Born in Alba Iulia, Culda started his career at local club Unirea Alba Iulia, for which he played its first match as a senior at the age of 18, at that time Unirea being in the fifth division. Culda scored 32 goals in his first season, being decisive in Unirea's promotion campaign. The poor financial situation of "the Black and Whites" and the lack of an ambitious goal made the youngster move Mureșul Vințu de Jos.

Mureșul Vințu de Jos
Arrived in the summer of 2015 at Vințu de Jos, Culda was an important member of the team which would win Liga IV-Alba County series and subsequently the promotion play-off against Mureșul Luduș, Mureș County champions. He played in a very good team for that level with experienced players such as: Ovidiu Stoianof, Mădălin Popa, Răzvan Dulap or Nicușor Bănică and an experienced manager, Dan Mănăilă. Culda scored 12 goals in 25 matches, but after promotion, there have been major financial problems at the club and he had to transfer again, back to Unirea.

Unirea Alba Iulia
In the summer of 2016, Culda returned to Unirea, which was promoted to Liga III due to the excellent results at the youth level. He continued its good form and scored another 5 goals in only 9 matches.

Astra Giurgiu
In the summer of 2017, Sebastian Culda signed with Astra Giurgiu and in the first part of the championship he played for the second team, from Liga III, scoring 4 goals.

On 10 March 2018, Culda made his Liga I debut for Astra in a 0–1 loss to CS Universitatea Craiova.

References

External links
 
 Sebastian Culda at LPF.ro

1996 births
Living people
Sportspeople from Alba Iulia
Romanian footballers
Association football midfielders
Liga I players
FC Astra Giurgiu players
Liga II players
FC Metaloglobus București players
CSM Unirea Alba Iulia players